The Death of Sardanapalus (La Mort de Sardanapale) is an oil painting on canvas by Eugène Delacroix, dated 1827. It currently hangs in the Musée du Louvre, Paris. A smaller replica, painted by Delacroix in 1844, is now in the Philadelphia Museum of Art.

The Death of Sardanapalus is based on the tale of Sardanapalus, a king of Assyria, from the historical library of Diodorus Siculus, the ancient Greek historian, and is a work of the era of Romanticism. This painting uses rich, vivid and warm colours, and broad brushstrokes. It was inspired by Lord Byron's play Sardanapalus (1821), and in turn inspired a cantata by Hector Berlioz, Sardanapale (1830), and also Franz Liszt's opera, Sardanapalo (1845–1852, unfinished).

Visual analysis 

The main focus of Death of Sardanapalus is a large bed draped in rich red fabric. On it lies a man with a disinterested eye overseeing a scene of chaos. He is dressed in flowing white fabrics and sumptuous gold around his neck and head. A woman lies dead at his feet, prone across the lower half of the large bed. She is one of six in the scene, all in various shades of undress, and all in assorted throes of death by the hands of the half dozen men in the scene. There are several people being stabbed with knives and one man is dying from a self-inflicted wound from a sword, and a man in the left foreground is attempting to kill an intricately adorned horse. A young man by the king's right elbow is standing behind a side table which has an elaborate golden decanter and a cup. There are golden elephant heads at the base of the bed, as well as various valuable trinkets scattered amongst the carnage. In the background, several architectural elements are visible but difficult to discern.

Delacroix used a painterly brushstroke in this painting, which allows for a strong sense of movement in the work. This scene is chaotic and violent, as showcased by the movement, weapons, and the colors used. The redness of the bed stands out against the somewhat obscured, dark background. The whiteness of Sardanapalus's robe, the creamy lines of the dying women's limbs, and the shimmers of gold objects throughout the scene pull the viewer's eye quickly around the painting.

There is asymmetry in the work, but the composition remains balanced. One woman reclined by an elephant head on the end of the bed is the only figure to engage with the viewer. Everyone else in the painting is focused on the task at hand: death.

Reception
Delacroix's Death of Sardanapalus was controversial and polarizing at its exhibition at the Paris Salon of 1828. Delacroix's main figural subject was Sardanapalus, a king willing to destroy all of his possessions, including people and luxurious goods, in a funerary pyre of gore and excess. Sardanapalus was not a classical hero, like the Horatii in Jacques-Louis David’s eponymous painting. Delacroix's Sardanapalus was the antithesis of neoclassical traditions, which favored subdued colors, rigid space, and an overall moral subject matter. He also used foreshortening to tilt the death scene directly into the space of the audience, a far cry from the subdued order of traditional academic paintings. Dorothy Bussy quotes one critic of the work as calling the painting "the fanaticism of ugliness" when it appeared in the Salon in 1828. 

Linda Nochlin has argued that this painting scandalized the salon because it was understood by contemporaries as a destructive sexual fantasy of Delacroix's own--a collapse of the distinction between the "Other" of Orientalism (i.e., Sardanapalus) and western man. 

The composer Franz Liszt was inspired by Delacroix's painting (and Byron's play) to compose an Italian opera--Sardanapalo--on the topic, telling Princess Cristina Belgiojoso that, in view of the king's self-immolation, his finale will aim to 'set the entire audience alight'. He completed Act 1 only in 1852 and abandoned the project thereafter. The completed first act received its premiere in 2018.

Notes

References
 Bussy, Dorothy. Eugène Delacroix. London: Duckworth and Co., 1912.
 Trippett, David, "An Uncrossable Rubicon: Liszt's Sardanapalo Revisited," Journal of the Royal Music Association 143 (2018), 361-432.

External links

 The Death of Sardanapalus – Analysis and Critical Reception
 Eugène Delacroix (1798–1863): Paintings, Drawings, and Prints from North American Collections, a full text exhibition catalog from The Metropolitan Museum of Art, which discusses The Death of Sardanapalus 
 The Destroyed Room, a 1978 photograph by Jeff Wall was inspired by this work (TATE Modern).

Ancient Mesopotamia in popular culture
1827 paintings
Paintings about death
Paintings by Eugène Delacroix
Paintings in the Louvre by French artists
Horses in art
Sardanapalus